Robin Thorne (4 April 1930 – 20 April 2017) was a South African cricketer. He played in 44 first-class matches for Border from 1948/49 to 1964/65.

See also
 List of Border representative cricketers

References

External links
 

1930 births
2017 deaths
South African cricketers
Border cricketers
Cricketers from Port Elizabeth